A spelling alphabet (also called by various other names) is a set of words used to represent the letters of an alphabet in oral communication, especially over a two-way radio or telephone. The words chosen to represent the letters sound sufficiently different from each other to clearly differentiate them. This avoids any confusion that could easily otherwise result from the names of letters that sound similar, except for some small difference easily missed or easily degraded by the imperfect sound quality of the apparatus. For example, in the Latin alphabet, the letters B, P, and D ("bee", "pee" and "dee") sound similar and could easily be confused, but the words "bravo", "papa" and "delta" sound completely different, making confusion unlikely.

Any suitable words can be used in the moment, making this form of communication easy even for people not trained on any particular standardized spelling alphabet. For example, it is common to hear a nonce form like "A as in 'apple', D as in 'dog', P as in 'paper'" over the telephone in customer support contexts. However, to gain the advantages of standardization in contexts involving trained persons, a standard version can be convened by an organization. Many (loosely or strictly) standardized spelling alphabets exist, mostly owing to historical siloization, where each organization simply created its own. International air travel created a need for a worldwide standard.

Today the most widely known spelling alphabet is the ICAO International Radiotelephony Spelling Alphabet, also known as the NATO phonetic alphabet, which is used for Roman letters. Spelling alphabets also exist for Greek and for Russian.

Terminology
Spelling alphabets are called by various names, according to context. These synonyms include spelling alphabet, word-spelling alphabet, voice procedure alphabet, radio alphabet, radiotelephony alphabet, telephone alphabet, and telephony alphabet. A spelling alphabet is also often called a phonetic alphabet, especially by amateur radio enthusiasts, recreational sailors in the US and Australia, and NATO military organizations, despite this usage of the term producing a naming collision with the usage of the same phrase in phonetics to mean a notation used for phonetic transcription or phonetic spelling, such as the International Phonetic Alphabet, which is used to indicate the sounds of human speech.

History
The names of the letters of the English alphabet are "a", "bee", "cee", "dee", "e", etc. These can be difficult to discriminate, particularly over a limited-bandwidth and noisy communications channel, hence the use in aviation and by armed services of unambiguous substitute names for use in electrical voice communication such as telephone and radio.

A large number of spelling alphabets have been developed over the past century, with the first ones being used to overcome problems with the early wired telephone networks, and the later ones being focused on wireless two-way radio (radiotelephony) links. Often, each communications company and each branch of each country's military developed its own spelling alphabet, with the result that one 1959 research effort documented a full 203 different spelling alphabets, comprising 1600 different words, leading the author of the report to ask:

Each word in the spelling alphabet typically replaces the name of the letter with which it starts (acrophony). It is used to spell out words when speaking to someone not able to see the speaker, or when the audio channel is not clear. The lack of high frequencies on standard telephones makes it hard to distinguish an 'F' from an 'S' for example. Also, the lack of visual cues during oral communication can cause confusion. For example, lips are closed at the start of saying the letter "B" but open at the beginning of the letter "D" making these otherwise similar-sounding letters more easily discriminated when looking at the speaker. Without these visual cues, such as during announcements of airline gate numbers "B1" and "D1" at an airport, "B" may be confused with "D" by the listener. Spelling out one's name, a password or a ticker symbol over the telephone are other scenarios where a spelling alphabet is useful.

British Army signallers began using a partial spelling alphabet in the late 19th century.  Recorded in the 1898 "Signalling Instruction" issued by the War Office and followed by the 1904 Signalling Regulations this system differentiated only the letters most frequently misunderstood: Ack (originally "Ak") Beer (or Bar) C D E F G H I J K L eMma N O Pip Q R eSses Toc U Vic W X Y Z. This alphabet was the origin of phrases such as "ack-ack" (A.A. for anti-aircraft), "pip-emma" for pm and Toc H for an ex-servicemen's association. It was developed on the Western Front of the First World War. The RAF developed their "telephony spelling alphabet", which was adopted by all three services and civil aviation in the UK from 1921.

It was later formally codified to provide a word for all 26 letters (see comparative tabulation of Western military alphabets).

For civilian users, in particular in the field of finance, alternative alphabets arose. Common personal names were a popular choice, and the First Name Alphabet came into common use.

Voice procedure

Spelling alphabets are especially useful when speaking in a noisy environment when clarity and promptness of communication is essential, for example during two-way radio communication between an aircraft pilot and air traffic control, or in military operations.  Whereas the names of many letters sound alike, the set of replacement words can be selected to be as distinct from each other as possible, to minimise the likelihood of ambiguity or mistaking one letter for another.  For example, if a burst of static cuts off the start of an English-language utterance of the letter J, it may be mistaken for A or K.  In the international radiotelephony spelling alphabet known as the ICAO (or NATO) phonetic alphabet, the sequence J–A–K would be pronounced Juliett–Alfa–Kilo.  Some voice procedure standards require numbers to be spelled out digit by digit, so some spelling alphabets replace confusable digit names with more distinct alternatives; for example, the NATO alphabet has “niner” for 9 to distinguish it better from 5 (pronounced as “fife”) and the German word “nein”.

Flaghoist spelling alphabets
Although no radio or traditional telephone communications are involved in communicating flag signals among ships, the instructions for which flags to hoist are relayed by voice on each ship displaying flags, and whether this is done by shouting between decks, sound tubes, or sound-powered telephones, some of the same distortions that make a spelling alphabet for radiotelephony also make a spelling alphabet desirable for directing seamen in which flags to hoist. The first documented use of this were two different alphabets used by U.S. Navy circa 1908. By 1942, the U.S. Army's radiotelephony spelling alphabet was associated with the International Code of Signals (ICS) flags.

Telephone spelling alphabets
While spelling alphabets today are mostly used over two-way radio voice circuits (radiotelephony), early on in telecommunications there were also telephone-specific spelling alphabets, which were developed to deal with the noisy conditions on long-distance circuits. Their development was loosely intertwined with radiotelephony spelling alphabets, but were developed by different organizations; for example, AT&T developed a spelling alphabet for its long-distance operators, another for its international operators; Western Union developed one for the public to use when dictating telegrams over the telephone; and ITU-T developed a spelling alphabet for telephone networks, while ITU-R was involved in the development of radiotelephony spelling alphabets. Even though both of these groups were part of the same ITU, and thus part of the UN, their alphabets often differed from each other.
Uniquely, the 1908 Tasmanian telegraph operator's code was designed to be memorized as follows:

Radiotelephony spelling alphabets

During WWI 

In World War I battle lines were relatively static and forces were commonly linked by wired telephones. Signals could be weak on long wire runs and field telephone systems often used a single wire with earth return, which made them subject to inadvertent and deliberate interference. Spelling alphabets were introduced for wire telephony as well as on the newer radio voice equipment.

Between WWI and WWII 
Commercial and international telephone and radiotelephone spelling alphabets.

During WWII 

The later NATO phonetic alphabet evolved from the procedures of several different Allied nations during World War II, including:
 The United States Navy (multiple versions in 1913, 1927, 1938, and WWII)
 The United States Army (multiple versions in 1916, 1939, 1944, and 1961)
 The United States Army Air Force
 Joint Army/Navy Phonetic Alphabet (1941–1956)
 The British Royal Air Force phonetic alphabet (1921 onwards)

Post-WWII 

For the 1938 and 1947 alphabets, each transmission of figures is preceded and followed by the words "as a number" spoken twice.

The ITU adopted the International Maritime Organization's phonetic spelling alphabet in 1959, and in 1969 specified that it be "for application in the maritime mobile service only".

During the late 1940s and early 1950s, there were two international aviation radio spelling alphabets, the "Able Baker" was used by most Western countries, while the "Ana Brazil" alphabet was used by South American and Caribbean regions.

Pronunciation was not defined prior to 1959. From 1959 to present, the underlined syllable of each code word for the letters should be stressed, and from 1969 to present, each syllable of the code words for the digits should be equally stressed, with the exceptions of the unstressed second syllables of fower, seven, niner, hundred.

ICAO Radiotelephone Spelling Alphabet
After WWII, the major work in producing a better spelling alphabet was conducted by the ICAO, which was subsequently adopted in modified form by the ITU and IMO. Its development is related to these various international conventions on radio, including:
 Universal Electrical Communications Union, Washington, D.C., December 1920
 International Radiotelegraph Convention, Washington, 1927 (which created the CCIR)
 General Radiocommunication and Additional Regulations (Madrid, 1932)
 Instructions for the International Telephone Service, 1932 (ITU-T E.141; withdrawn in 1993)
 The  ARRL and 1928 Western Union alphabets likely originated earlier.
 General Radiocommunication Regulations and Additional Radiocommunication Regulations (Cairo, 1938)
 Radio Regulations and Additional Radio Regulations (Atlantic City, 1947), where "it was decided that the International Civil Aviation Organization and other international aeronautical organizations would assume the responsibility for procedures and regulations related to aeronautical communication. However, ITU would continue to maintain general procedures regarding distress signals."
 1959 Administrative Radio Conference (Geneva, 1959)
 Final Acts of WARC-79 (Geneva, 1979). Here the alphabet was formally named "Phonetic Alphabet and Figure Code".
 International Code of Signals for Visual, Sound, and Radio Communications, United States Edition, 1969 (Revised 2003)
 NATO phonetic alphabet history
 International Telecommunication Union, Radio
The ICAO Radiotelephony Alphabet is defined by the International Civil Aviation Organization for international aircraft communications.

Law enforcement
Defined by the Association of Public-Safety Communications Officials-International.

The APCO first suggested that its Procedure and Signals Committee work out a system for a "standard set of words representing the alphabet should be used by all stations" in its April 1940 newsletter.

Note: The old APCO alphabet has wide usage among Public Safety agencies nationwide, even though APCO itself deprecated the alphabet in 1974, replacing it with the ICAO spelling alphabet. See https://www.apcointl.org and APCO radiotelephony spelling alphabet.

Amateur radio
The FCC regulations for Amateur radio state that "Use of a phonetic alphabet as an aid for correct station identification is encouraged" (47 C.F.R. § 97.119(b)(2)), but does not state which set of words should be used. Officially the same as used by ICAO, but there are significant variations commonly used by stations participating in HF contests and DX (especially in international HF communications).

The official ARRL alphabet changed over the years, sometimes to reflect the current norms, and sometimes by the force of law. In rules made effective beginning April 1, 1946, the FCC forbade using the names of cities, states, or countries in spelling alphabets.

Additions in other languages
Certain languages' standard alphabets have letters, or letters with diacritics (e.g., umlauts, rings, tildes), that do not exist in the English alphabet. If these letters have two-letter ASCII substitutes, the ICAO/ITU code words for the two letters are used.

Czech 
Czech "ů", historically uo, is Uniform-Oscar (uo).

Danish and Norwegian 
In Danish  and Norwegian the letters "æ", "ø" and "å" have their own code words. In Danish Ægir, Ødis and Åse represent the three letters, while in Norwegian the three code words are Ægir, Ørnulf and Ågot for civilians and Ærlig, Østen and Åse for military personnel.

Estonian 
Estonian has four special letters, õ, ä, ö and ü. Õnne represents õ, Ärni for ä, Ööbik for ö and Ülle for ü.

Finnish 
In Finnish there are special code words for the letters å, ä and ö. Åke is used to represent å, Äiti is used for ä and Öljy for ö. These code words are used only in national operations, the last remnants of the Finnish radio alphabet.

German 
In German, Alfa-Echo (ae) may be used for "ä", Oscar-Echo (oe) for "ö", Sierra-Sierra (ss) for "ß", and Uniform-Echo (ue) for "ü".

Greek 
The Greek spelling alphabet is a spelling alphabet for the Greek language, i.e. a set of names used in lieu of alphabet letters for the purpose of spelling out words. It is used by the Greek armed and emergency services.

Malay 
Malay (including Indonesian) represents the letter "L" with "London", since the word lima means "five" in this language.

Russian 
The Russian spelling alphabet is a spelling alphabet for the Russian version of the Cyrillic alphabet.

Spanish 
In Spanish the word ñoño ('dull') is used for ñ.

Swedish 
Åke is used for "å"  Ärlig for "ä" and Östen for "ö" in the Swedish spelling alphabet, though the two-letter substitutes aa, ae and oe respectively may be used in absence of the specific letters.

Table of spelling alphabets by language

Other alphabets
The PGP word list, the Bubble Babble wordlist used by ssh-keygen, and the S/KEY dictionary, are spelling alphabets for public key fingerprints (or other binary data) – a set of names given to data bytes for the purpose of spelling out binary data in a clear and unambiguous way via a voice channel.

Many unofficial spelling alphabets are in use that are not based on a standard, but are based on words the transmitter can remember easily, including first names, states, or cities. The LAPD phonetic alphabet has many first names. The German spelling alphabet ("Deutsches Funkalphabet" (literally "German Radio Alphabet")) also uses first names. Also, during the Vietnam war, soldiers used 'Cain' instead of 'Charlie' because 'Charlie' meant Viet Cong (Charlie being short for Victor Charlie, the International alphabet spelling of the initials VC).

See also
NATO phonetic alphabet
Allied Military Phonetic Spelling Alphabet
APCO radiotelephony spelling alphabet
Language-specific spelling alphabets
 Greek spelling alphabet
 German spelling alphabet
 Dutch spelling alphabet
 Russian spelling alphabet
 Swedish Armed Forces' radio alphabet
 Japanese radiotelephony alphabet
 Korean spelling alphabet
Cockney alphabet

Explanatory notes

References

External links
 Phonetic/spelling Alphabets for various languages from Brian Kelk's website
 Website converting text to telephone alphabet, (non-standard English, NATO, 14 other languages).
 Website converting text to NATO and several military English-language telephone alphabets
 Learn the NATO Radio Alphabet (and others) with flash cards game.
 Spelling alphabets from around the world including sound.